The 1895 LSU football team represented Louisiana State University (LSU) during the 1895 college football season. Coach Albert Simmonds, in his last year at LSU, guided the Tigers to an undefeated season, the first in program history. The season also featured the first home victory in LSU history with a win over Tulane in front of 1,500 spectators. A contemporary account reads "The Tulane football team, with its band of shouters and several crippled players, returned to the city yesterday morning wearing dejected faces, as a result of the defeat administered at Baton Rough Saturday." LSU joined the Southern Intercollegiate Athletic Association (SIAA) in 1895, and began playing as part of the conference in 1896.

Schedule

Roster

Roster from Fanbase.com and LSU: The Louisiana Tigers

References

LSU
LSU Tigers football seasons
College football undefeated seasons
LSU Tigers football